The Quick and the Undead is a 2006 Western zombie horror film written, directed, and produced by Gerald Nott.

Plot
In the present, a plague breaks out causing the infected to become zombies. The action starts 80 years later, where the western United States has devolved into a series of ghost towns overrun by zombies. The government awards bounty hunters bounties in exchange for pinkies of the undead.

Ryn Baskin (Clint Glenn) is a bounty hunter. After a successful hunt, he is robbed and left for dead by a rival gang of hunters, led by Blythe Remington (Parrish Randall), who plans to spread the plague, creating a larger bounty market. Ryn survives and follows Remington with the aid of Hans Tubman (Nicola Giacobbe), a foreigner who had double crossed Ryn. This leads him to a final confrontation not just with Blythe, but with a huge zombie army.

Cast
Clint Glenn as Ryn Baskin
Erin McCarthy as Hunter Leah
Dion Day as Jackson 
Nicola Giacobbe as Hans Tubman
Parrish Randall as Blythe Remington
Jeff Swarthout as Walters 
Derik Van Derbeken as Dr. Ambroseo 
Toar Campbell as Toar Zombie
Kim Solow as Little Girl Zombie

Reception

Moria gave the movie two and a half stars, finding it to be a successful, fast paced blend of the zombie and Spaghetti Western genres. It praised the homages to both Sergio Leone and George Romero.

References

External links
 
 
 The Quick and the Undead at AMG

2006 films
2006 horror films
2006 science fiction action films
2000s science fiction horror films
American Western (genre) horror films
American action horror films
American independent films
American science fiction action films
American science fiction horror films
American zombie films
2000s English-language films
2000s American films